"Million Euro Smile" is a song by Austrian pop rock band The Makemakes. It was released as a digital download in Austria on 15 April 2014. The song peaked at number 2 on the Austrian Singles Chart.

Track listing

Chart performance

Weekly charts

Release history

References

2014 singles
2014 songs
The Makemakes songs